Aidophus is a genus of aphodiinae dung beetles in the family Scarabaeidae. There are about 12 described species in Aidophus.

Species
These 12 species belong to the genus Aidophus:

 Aidophus cabrali (Petrovitz, 1973) c g
 Aidophus coheni Stebnicka & Skelley, 2005 c g
 Aidophus flaveolus (Harold, 1867) c g
 Aidophus flechtmanni Stebnicka & Dellacasa, 2001 c g
 Aidophus impressus (Petrovitz, 1970) c g
 Aidophus infuscatopennis (Schmidt, 1909) c g
 Aidophus kolbei (Schmidt, 1911) c g
 Aidophus notatus (Harold, 1859) c g
 Aidophus panamensis (Harold, 1859) c g
 Aidophus parcus (Horn, 1887) i c g b
 Aidophus pellax (Balthasar, 1960) c g
 Aidophus skelleyi Harpootlian & Gordon, 2002 i c g b

Data sources: i = ITIS, c = Catalogue of Life, g = GBIF, b = Bugguide.net

References

Further reading

 
 
 

Scarabaeidae
Articles created by Qbugbot